The name Ompong has been used for three tropical cyclones in the Philippines by PAGASA in the Western Pacific Ocean.

 Tropical Depression Ompong (2006) – wind shear from Typhoon Soulik prevented any intensification.
 Typhoon Vongfong (2014) (T1419, 19W, Ompong) – Category 5 super typhoon that struck mainland Japan.
 Typhoon Mangkhut (2018) (T1822, 26W, Ompong) —  a destructive Category 5 super typhoon that made landfall in Cagayan, Philippines, and subsequently impacted Hong Kong and southern China.

Ompong was retired from the PAGASA naming lists following the 2018 typhoon season and replaced with Obet.

Pacific typhoon set index articles